Waride Bakari Jabu (born 5 March 1961) is a Tanzanian CCM politician and Member of Parliament for Kiembesamaki constituency since 2010.

References

1961 births
Living people
Tanzanian Muslims
Chama Cha Mapinduzi MPs
Tanzanian MPs 2010–2015
University of Mauritius alumni